United States gubernatorial elections were held on November 4, 1986, in 36 states and two territories. The Democrats had a net loss of eight seats during this election, which coincided with the Senate and the House elections. This was despite the Democratic trend on a federal level, making this the last midterm election until 2022 where the party of the incumbent president achieved a net gain of governorships.

Election results
A bolded state name features an article about the specific election.

States

Territories and federal district

See also
1986 United States elections
1986 United States Senate elections
1986 United States House of Representatives elections

Notes

References

 
November 1986 events in the United States